Robert Hairston (1717August 3, 1791) was an 18th-century gentleman planter, politician, and military officer in the Virginia Colony.  He was an elected representative in both the House of Burgesses and the Virginia House of Delegates.

Family life
He was the son of Peter Hairston, who was known in the family as "The Immigrant". His wife was Ruth Stovall, daughter of George Stovall, a clerk of the Virginia House of Burgesses.
They had nine children: Colonel George Hairston; Colonel Samuel Hairston; Ann Hairston (Mrs. Charles Woods); Peter Hairston; Martha Patsy Hairston (Mrs. Alexander Hunter (planter)); Sarah Hairston (Mrs. Baldwin Rowland); Elizabeth Hairston (Mrs. Michael Rowland); Agnes Hairston (Mrs. John Woods) and Ruth Hairston (Mrs. Peter Wilson).

He established the first Hairston home in Henry county, "Marrowbone plantation", during the period of 1775–1776. Marrowbone was passed down to his son George, and remained in the family for the next five generations, until 1881. "Following the calamities of the War Between the States, this splendid property passed out of the hands of the former owners and has been allowed to deteriorate beyond recognition." Other accounts say that Marrowbone plantation was constructed in 1759, in Pittsylvania County, Virginia, which later became part of Henry County. A third account claims the house was built in 1749.

On the various farms and holdings the family owned, by the end of the 18th century he also owned nineteen slaves. In 1791, he owned 1,684 acres of land.

Ruth Stovall died in 1808.

Military career
Robert Hairston was a captain in the Virginia military, and served as an ensign in the Virginia Colonial Militia from Bedford County, Virginia, during the French and Indian War of 1754–1763.
During the American Revolution, he also served as a sheriff in his county, and as a captain of the local militia company. The Daughters of the American Revolution have given his service record the identification number A049164.

Robert Hairston was appointed an Ensign in September 1758, two years after his commission in 1756, and then in 1759 he was appointed a captain. He was appointed a Lieutenant from Bedford County on October 27, 1756, and on May 28, 1759, "Robert Harstone" was commissioned a captain.

During the American Revolution, he served as a militia captain, and two of his older sons, Colonel George Hairston and Colonel Samuel Hairston, achieved even higher ranks in the Continental army.

Political career
He was a Commissioner of Peace, and took the oath of allegiance to the revolution in 1776, and previously had received his commission from Thomas Nelson, Jr. appointing him the "High sheriff" of Henry County.
Robert Hairston was elected to the House of Representatives for his county.

With holdings in several counties, and in counties that divided and became two or more counties, Robert Hairston was a county justice or judge in several jurisdictions. He was a Judge in Pittsylvania County, Virginia in 1775 and Henry County in 1778 and Franklin County in 1785. He became a judge in Franklin County in 1786 and also in Henry County. In 1786, he was the third highest tax payer in Franklin County, Virginia.

Robert Hairston was elected to the Virginia House of Burgesses for Campbell County, Virginia. He served in the House of Delegates of the Virginia General Assembly in the May 5, to June 28, 1777, and October 20 to January 24, 1778, Sessions with the other Henry county representative, Abram Penn.

Death and burial
Robert Hairston died in 1791 at farm called "Runnett Bag", in Franklin County. Ruth Stovall Hairston died in 1808. At the time of his death in 1791, he owned 1,684 acres of land and twenty-two slaves. He was one of the richest men in Franklin County, and after all his bequests were distributed, his estate was worth £499.1.6 (499 pounds, one shilling, sixpence). Like most families of this age in the Virginia Piedmont, their valuables were held in their lands and slaves. Except for a silver watch, no gold or silver was part of the Hairston estate, and no paintings, carriages or billiard tables are listed in the estate inventory. Much of his land had already been given to his children before his death, and each daughter specifically had been given a farm in their own names. "Hairston endowed each of his daughters- as did most fathers who were able to do so- with her own estate to control independently of her present or future husband."

It is believed that Robert and his wife Ruth are buried under the waters of the present day Philpott Dam, which was completed in 1952. The headstones of Robert and Ruth's graves were relocated to high ground, but not their remains. There were 19 cemeteries covered by Philpott Lake."

References

1719 births
1791 deaths
People from Henry County, Virginia
Scottish emigrants to the Thirteen Colonies
Virginia colonial people
House of Burgesses members
People of Virginia in the French and Indian War
Virginia militiamen in the American Revolution
American planters
American slave owners
18th-century American politicians